Parliamentary elections were held in Iran between 30 July and 20 August 1960.

In order to demonstrate the appearance of a democratic free election, the Shah allowed candidates from the popular National Front to compete, however it returned no seats for them.

The announced result was a massive victory for the Prime Minister Eghbal's Party of Nationalists. The elections "were extensively and clumsily rigged" and the fraud "was exposed in the press, provoked public rancor and restlessness".

Aside from the opposition figures, pseudo-opposition People's Party and a number of independents led by Ali Amini denounced the elections. The results were annulled by the Shah, and fresh elections were held the following year.

Results

Zonis (1971) and Mehrdad (1980)

Chehabi (1990)

See also
 List of annulled elections

References

1960 elections in Asia
1960 elections in Iran
Electoral fraud in Iran
Annulled elections
Iranian Senate elections
National Consultative Assembly elections
Lower house elections in Iran